Pinconning may refer to

 Pinconning, Michigan
 Pinconning Township, Michigan
 Pinconning River
 Pinconning cheese